Wuhu Olympic Stadium is a multi-use stadium in Wuhu, China.  It is currently used mostly for football matches.  The stadium holds 40,000 people and opened in 2002.

Football venues in China
Sports venues in Anhui